Mateusz Spychała (born 28 January 1998) is a Polish professional footballer who plays as a right-back for Odra Opole.

Club career

In 2019, he signed for Korona Kielce.

On 21 August 2020, he signed a two-year contract with Warta Poznań.

References

1998 births
People from Sieraków
Sportspeople from Greater Poland Voivodeship
Living people
Polish footballers
Poland youth international footballers
Association football defenders
Lech Poznań II players
Radomiak Radom players
Wigry Suwałki players
Stal Mielec players
Korona Kielce players
Warta Poznań players
Odra Opole players
Ekstraklasa players
I liga players
II liga players
III liga players